Bodo is a possibly extinct Bantu language of the Central African Republic. It may be part of a group of languages called "Lebonya".

References

Lebonya languages
Languages of the Central African Republic
Endangered Niger–Congo languages